Light Years, The Very Best of Electric Light Orchestra is a two CD compilation album by Electric Light Orchestra (ELO), released in 1997.

The album celebrates the band's 25th Anniversary singles career starting in 1972 and contains all of ELO's 29 UK hit singles plus other single edits that either didn't chart or were hits in other countries.

All the songs included are reputed to be the edited 7" single versions; analysis of the vinyl 7" singles contradicts the claim. For example, the intro/count-in of "Four Little Diamonds" was trimmed from the original 7", but included here; the intro of "Strange Magic" was shorter on the 7".

It is also the first ELO compilation to feature the song "Across the Border" which was scheduled to be released as an EP track in 1980 but was withdrawn. Although not in chronological order, it is however the most comprehensive assemblage of the band's hits of the many compilations available.

The album reached 60 in the UK Album Charts. The album was also released in Europe with an identical track order under the titles, The Swedish Collection and The Danish Collection released in 2000.

Track listing

Personnel
Jeff Lynne – vocals, guitars, keyboards
Roy Wood – vocals, cello, oboe, bass guitar
Bev Bevan – drums, percussion
Richard Tandy – synthesizers, mellotron, clavinet, piano, guitar
Kelly Groucutt – vocals, bass guitar
Hugh McDowell – cello
Mik Kaminski – violin
Melvyn Gale – cello
Mike de Albuquerque – bass guitar, vocals
Mike Edwards – cello
Wilf Gibson – violin
Colin Walker – cello
Bill Hunt – French horn
Steve Woolam – violin

Certifications

References

Albums produced by Jeff Lynne
Electric Light Orchestra compilation albums
1997 greatest hits albums
Epic Records compilation albums